T.O.P is an Scandinavian DJ. In 1993 he won the international remix and scratch composition organized by Disco Mix Club. He was part of mixing and mastering some of the biggest Eurodance stars throughout the 1990s from Modern Talking to Technotronic.

In 1998 he took a hiatus from Dj-ing and moved to Berne in Germany where he became an executive at BMG and launching their Schlager sub label with Dieter Bohlen of Modern Talking. He is second highest ranked DJ from Indonesia (after Angger Dimas) on the Official Global DJ Rankings, though he mostly plays in Berlin these days, among other places in the legendary Berghain club.

In 2008 he released several funk singles on vinyl: Open World For You, and Sweet Funk received heavy airplay rotation in Northern Europe. Since then he has been mixing and mastering music for many European artists, e.g. Gesaffelstein, Safri Duo and several others.

List of releases under his executive management at BMG Munich 
 Planet S	Spar Dich Reich (CD, Maxi)	74321 60884 2	1998
 DuMonde	Tomorrow (The Mixes) (12")	74321 61007 1	1998
 Metrix	City Of Sin (CD, Maxi)	74321 61204 2	1998
 Panic Xperience	Godzilla (12")	74321 62094 1	1998
 Soultans	Rhythm Of Love (CD, Single, Car)	74321 581622	1998
 DJ Piero	Don't Stop The Music (CD, Maxi)	74321 64259 2	1999
 Peter Kent	It's A Real Good Feeling (CD, Single)	74321 67767 2	1999
 E-Rotic	Mambo No. Sex (CD, Maxi)	74321 70075 2	1999
 Innosense	Say No More (CD, Single, Dig)	07863 60257-2	2000
 Chixx	We Walk In The Park (CD, Maxi)	74321 76889 2	2000
Love Bug Lovers	I'm A Love Bug (Open Me Up) (12")	74321 82991 1	2001

List of eponymous releases 

 T.O.P	Oh Mother (CD)	TEC 666 009	1996
 T.O.P	I Like the Girl feat. Miku Hatsune (CD, Maxi)	TEC 666 045	2008
 T.O.P	Open World For YOU (CD, Maxi)	TEC 666 069	2009
 T.O.P	Sweet Funk (CD, Maxi)	TEC 666 118	2009

References

Year of birth missing (living people)
Living people
Indonesian DJs